Objev na Střapaté hůrce is a 1962 Czechoslovak drama film directed by Karel Steklý.

Cast
 Otomar Korbelář
 Otto Šimánek
 Walter Taub

References

External links
 

1962 films
1962 drama films
Children's drama films
Czech drama films
Czechoslovak drama films
1960s Czech-language films
Films directed by Karel Steklý
Czech children's films
1960s Czech films